HHPC may refer to:
 Hanke–Henry Permanent Calendar
 Houay Ho Power Company, operator of Houay Ho Dam
 NASA Human Health and Performance Center